Traveller's Tales is a British video game developer and a subsidiary of TT Games. Traveller's Tales was founded in 1989 by Jon Burton and Andy Ingram. Initially a small company focused on its own content, it grew in profile through developing games with larger companies such as Sega and Disney Interactive Studios. In 2004, development on Lego Star Wars: The Video Game started with Giant Interactive Entertainment, the exclusive rights holder to Lego video games. Traveller's Tales bought the company in 2005, and the two merged to create TT Games, with Traveller's Tales becoming the new company's development arm.

History

Founding and work with Sega and Disney (1995–2007)

Traveller's Tales started developing games with Psygnosis, which were most notable for creating 3D effects. Their first game was Leander, also known as The Legend of Galahad. With Psygnosis they developed a video game adaption of Bram Stoker's Dracula, as well as other original productions like Puggsy. Thanks to an agreement between Psygnosis, Sony Imagesoft and Disney Interactive Studios, Traveller's Tales could produce several games based on Disney's properties, such as the Mickey Mouse game Mickey Mania: The Timeless Adventures of Mickey Mouse and other games based on Pixar movies like Toy Story, A Bug's Life, Toy Story 2: Buzz Lightyear to the Rescue and Finding Nemo (the latter two thanks to agreements with Activision and THQ).

However, Traveller's Tales was best known in the 1990s and early 2000s for their second-party collaboration with Sega to develop games based on the Sonic the Hedgehog franchise, resulting in Sonic 3D Blast and Sonic R, which were produced in close effort with Sega's Sonic Team. Both games were regarded as technical achievements in the Mega Drive (Sonic 3D Blast) and the Sega Saturn (Sonic R), adding to the high-tech development status they already had with games like Puggsy, Mickey Mania and Toy Story. They were also responsible for Crash Bandicoot: The Wrath of Cortex and Crash Twinsanity, under the Vivendi label.

They developed Lego Star Wars: The Video Game as well as its follow-ups. Outside of the Lego games, their work includes the franchise Crash Bandicoot, The Chronicles of Narnia, Super Monkey Ball Adventure, and World Rally Championship and F1 Grand Prix for the PlayStation Portable.

Warner Bros. acquisition and Lego titles (2007–present)
The company was purchased by Warner Bros. Interactive Entertainment at the end of 8 November 2007, but continued to operate independently. Following the release of Prince Caspian (2008), Traveller's Tales would work exclusively on Lego titles – though other TT subsidiaries such as TT Fusion continued to use other IP until the early 2010s. While some of the early Lego titles would be published by LucasArts, from 2011 Warner would also act as the studio's exclusive publisher.

In 2015, Traveller's Tales entered the toys-to-life business with Lego Dimensions, which used a toy pad to enter physical Lego minifigures and Lego models into the game, as well as interact with gameplay. The game included existing Lego themes like DC Comics, The Lego Movie and The Lord of the Rings, as well as completely new properties such as Portal 2 and Wizard of Oz. The game was discontinued in October 2017.

Traveller's Tales has won two BAFTAs, one for Gameplay with Lego Star Wars II: The Original Trilogy, and one for Children's Videogame of the Year for Lego Batman: The Videogame.

On 20 January 2022, a report published by Polygon detailed the amount of crunch that occurred at the studio during the development of Lego Star Wars: The Skywalker Saga, including dozens inside the company being at odds with management, due to expressing frustration over tight development schedules, the company's crunch culture, and outdated development tools. In addition, the use of NTT (a new in-house engine that was being developed to replace Traveller's Tales' previous engine in attempt to avoid paying royalties for using a third-party engine like Unreal Engine or Unity) was extremely controversial within the company, as many employees had been pushing to instead use Unreal Engine. NTT turned out to be incredibly difficult to use, with some animations taking hours more to produce than they would on the old engine. As a result, The Skywalker Saga would end up being the only game developed by Traveller's Tales to use NTT, with the company deciding to use Unreal Engine going forward for their future projects.

Games developed

References

External links
 

1989 establishments in England
2005 mergers and acquisitions
British companies established in 1989
British subsidiaries of foreign companies
Companies based in Cheshire
Knutsford
Video game companies established in 1989
Video game companies of the United Kingdom
Video game development companies
Warner Bros. Games